The 2018–19 Fresno State Bulldogs men's basketball team represented California State University, Fresno in the 2018–19 NCAA Division I men's basketball season. The Bulldogs were led by first-year head coach Justin Hutson and played their home games at the Save Mart Center as members of the Mountain West Conference. They finished the season 23–9, 13–5 in Mountain West play to finish in third place. They defeated Air Force in the quarterfinals of the Mountain West tournament before losing in the semifinals to Utah State. Despite having 23 wins, they did not participate in a postseason tournament.

Previous season
The Bulldogs finished the season 21–11, 11–7 in Mountain West play to finish in a tie for fourth place. They lost in the quarterfinals of the Mountain West Conference tournament to San Diego State. Despite having 21 wins, they did not participate in a postseason tournament.

On March 12, 2018, head coach Rodney Terry left Fresno State to become head coach at UTEP. He finished at Fresno State with a seven-year record of 126–108. On April 5, it was announced that the school had hired San Diego State assistant coach Justin Hutson as head coach.

Offseason

Departures

Incoming transfers

2018 recruiting class

Preseason

Roster

Schedule and results
Source

|-
!colspan=12 style=""| Exhibition

|-
!colspan=12 style=""| Non-conference regular season

|-
!colspan=12 style=""| Mountain West regular season

|-
!colspan=12 style=""|

References

Fresno State Bulldogs men's basketball seasons
Fresno State